Tarullo is a surname. Notable people with the surname include:

Daniel Tarullo (born 1952), American government official
Matthew Tarullo (born 1982), American football player

See also
Tarallo